The Triaenonychidae are a family of harvestmen with about 120 genera and more than 440 described species.

Description
The armed pedipalps are large, and much stronger than the legs.

Distribution
Triaenonychidae are found in North and South America, Japan and Korea, Australia and New Zealand, and Madagascar.

Relationships
The Triaenonychidae should probably split into at least two families. The genera from the Australian region are considered Triaenonychidae sensu stricto, and may include the strange Synthetonychiidae; the northern species should be grouped with Travuniidae.

Name

Genera
The following genera are included in the family:

Triaenonychinae Sørensen in L. Koch, 1886
 Triaenonychini Sørensen in L. Koch, 1886
 Acumontia Loman, 1898
 Allonuncia Hickman, 1958
 Amatola Lawrence, 1931
 Ankaratrix Lawrence, 1959
 Ankylonuncia Hickman, 1958
 Antongila Roewer, 1931
 Austromontia Lawrence, 1931
 Austronuncia Lawrence, 1931
 Bezavonia Roewer, 1949
 Biacumontia Lawrence, 1931
 Brasiloctis Mello-Leitão, 1938
 Breviacantha Kauri, 1954
 Bryonuncia Hickman, 1958
 Callihamina Roewer, 1942
 Callihamus Roewer, 1931
 Calliuncus Roewer, 1931
 Ceratomontia Roewer, 1915
 Cluniella Forster, 1955
 Conoculus Forster, 1949
 Decarynella Fage, 1945
 Diaenobunus Roewer, 1914
 Diasia Sørensen, 1902
 Equitius Simon, 1880
 Graemontia Lawrence, 1931
 Gunvoria Kauri, 1961
 Hedwiga Roewer, 1931
 Hendea Roewer, 1931
 Hendeola Forster, 1954
 Heteronuncia Roewer, 1920
 Hickmanoxyomma G. S. Hunt, 1990
 Holonuncia Forster, 1955
 Hovanuncia Lawrence, 1959
 Ivohibea Lawrence, 1959
 Lawrencella Strand, 1932
 Leionuncia Hickman, 1958
 Lispomontia Lawrence, 1937
 Lizamontia Kury, 2004 South Africa
 Lomanella Pocock, 1903
 Mensamontia Lawrence, 1931
 Metanuncia Roewer, 1914
 Micromontia Lawrence, 1939
 Millomontia Lawrence, 1959
 Millotonyx Lawrence, 1959
 Monomontia Lawrence, 1931
 Nahuelonyx E. A. Maury, 1988
 Neonuncia Roewer, 1914
 Notonuncia Hickman, 1958
 Nucina Hickman, 1958
 Nuncia Loman, 1902
 Nunciella Roewer, 1929
 Nuncioides Hickman, 1958
 Odontonuncia Hickman, 1958
 Paramontia Lawrence, 1934
 Paranuncia Roewer, 1914
 Parattahia Roewer, 1914
 Paulianyx Lawrence, 1959
 Perthacantha Roewer, 1931
 Planimontia Kauri, 1961
 Prasma Roewer, 1931
 Prasmiola Forster, 1954
 Promecostethus Enderlein, 1909
 Psalenoba Roewer, 1931
 Rhynchobunus Hickman, 1958
 Roewerania Lawrence, 1934
 Rostromontia Lawrence, 1931
 Speleomontia Lawrence, 1931
 Stylonuncia Hickman, 1958
 Tasmanonyx Hickman, 1958
 Triaenomontia Roewer, 1914
 Triaenonychoides H. Soares, 1968
 Triaenonyx Sørensen in L. Koch, 1886
 Triconobunus Roewer, 1914
 Valdivionyx E. A. Maury, 1988
 Yatala Roewer, 1942
 Yulella Lawrence, 1939
 Adaeini Pocock, 1902
 Adaeulum Roewer, 1914
 Adaeum Karsch, 1880
 Cryptadaeum Lawrence, 1931
 Heteradaeum Lawrence, 1963
 Larifuga Loman, 1898
 Larifugella Lawrence, 1933
 Micradaeum Lawrence, 1931
 Montadaeum Lawrence, 1931
 Paradaeum Lawrence, 1931
 Triregia Forster, 1948
 Triaenobunini Pocock, 1902
 Pyenganella Hickman, 1958
 Tasmanonuncia Hickman, 1958
 Thelbunus Hickman, 1958
 Triaenobunus Sørensen in L. Koch, 1886
 Dingupa Forster, 1952
 Algidia Hogg, 1920
 Allobunus Hickman, 1958
 Americobunus Muñoz-Cuevas, 1972
 Araucanobunus Muñoz-Cuevas, 1973
 Cenefia Roewer, 1931
 Chilobunus Hickman, 1958
 Chrestobunus Roewer, 1914
 Dipristes Roewer, 1931
 Eubunus Hickman, 1958
 Glyptobunus Roewer, 1914
 Mestonia Hickman, 1958
 Miobunus Roewer, 1915
 Muscicola Forster, 1954
 Phanerobunus Roewer, 1915
 Phoxobunus Hickman, 1958
 Pristobunus Roewer, 1931
 incertae sedis
 Fumontana Shear, 1977
 Picunchenops E. A. Maury, 1988

 Kaolinonychinae Suzuki, 1975
 Kaolinonychus Suzuki, 1975
 Mutsunonychus Suzuki, 1976

 Nippononychinae Suzuki, 1975
 Nippononychus Suzuki, 1975
 Metanippononychus Suzuki, 1975
 Izunonychus Suzuki, 1975

 Paranonychinae Briggs, 1971
 Kainonychus Suzuki, 1975
 Metanonychus Briggs, 1971
 Paranonychus Briggs, 1971

 Sclerobuninae Dumitrescu, 1976
 Cyptobunus Banks, 1905
 Sclerobunus Banks, 1893
 Zuma Goodnight & Goodnight, 1942

 Soerensenellinae Forster, 1954
 Karamea Forster, 1954
 Soerensenella Pocock, 1903

References

Harvestmen
Harvestman families